The San Miguel del Ene attack was a massacre on 23 May 2021 in San Miguel del Ene, a rural area in the Vizcatán del Ene District of Satipo Province in Peru, in which 18 people were killed. It was perpetrated by the Militarized Communist Party of Peru (MPCP), a successor of the Maoist terrorist organization Shining Path. The attack was committed in the Valle de los Ríos Apurímac, Ene y Mantaro (VRAEM) conflict region, where the group operates.

Background 

Groups in VRAEM killed four family members in March 2021 in Huarcatán, accusing them of being police informers.

On 14 May, three weeks before the run-off vote in the 2021 presidential election, Comrade Vilmawho has close ties to Comrade José, head of the Militarized Communist Party of Perucalled for a boycott of the elections, specifically naming Keiko Fujimori and stating that anyone who voted for her would be an "accomplice in genocide and corruption". She had also made a similar call prior to the first round of the election, in which she criticized almost all the candidates but singled out Fujimori and Ollanta Humala as "direct enemies" of her organization.

Motives 
According to the leaflets found in the attack location, the perpetrators call upon to "clean VRAEM and Peru" of outcasts, "parasites and corrupts" as well as "homosexuals, lesbians, drug addicts" and "thieves".

Investigation 

The attack, which took place around 22:00 local time (UTC−05) on 23 May, was confirmed by general César Cervantes, commander general of the National Police of Peru, who informed about the mass shooting deaths of ten men, six women and two minors in a red-light zone bar in the locality. Along with the corpses, some of which were burned, leaflets signed by the MPCP were found, featuring the hammer and sickle and defining the attack as a social cleansing operation.

The leaflets also called for a boycott of the 6 June election, accusing of treason those who voted for Keiko Fujimori of the right-wing party Popular Force. The first analysis by the Counter Terrorism Directorate concluded with the preliminary result that the leaflets could have the characteristics of the language used by Shining Path.

The Ministry of Defense said that the attack was perpetrated by the Shining Path faction led by Comrade José. It gave the death toll of 14 people.

The Public Prosecution Service announced that the Huánuco and Selva Central Prosecutor Office specialized in crimes of terrorism and against humanity would take charge of the investigation and that the National Police would carry out the autopsies of the burned bodies, which would later be transferred to the Pichari District morgue.

Reactions 
Keiko Fujimori, presidential candidate of Popular Force, expressed categorical condemnation against the attack during a press conference in Tarapoto, as well as regret that "bloody acts" still happened in the country and her condolences to the relatives of the victims.

Pedro Castillo, presidential candidate of Free Peru, expressed regret towards the events during a rally in Huánuco and solidarity towards the relatives of the victims. Castillo also urged the National Police to investigate the attack to clarify the events. Vladimir Cerrón, Secretary General of Free Peru, published a tweet saying that "the right-wing needed [Shining] Path to win". Cerrón deleted the tweet moments later, questioning afterwards which one of the ideologies needed the terrorist group to win and condemning any act of terrorism.

Prime Minister Violeta Bermúdez and Defense Minister Nuria Esparch condemned the attack and guaranteed that the electoral process would take place normally. The Episcopal Conference of Peru also joined to express its condemnation.

See also 

 Hatun Asha ambush, a Shining Path attack on the military in the province of Huancayo during the 2016 general election

References

External links 
 Perú: 10 muertos en un ataque de Sendero Luminoso. BBC, 2016

2021 in Peru

2021 murders in Peru
21st-century mass murder in South America
Internal conflict in Peru
History of Junín Region
Lesbophobic violence
LGBT in Peru
Massacres in 2021
Massacres in Peru
May 2021 crimes in South America
Shining Path
Terrorist incidents in South America in 2021
Terrorist incidents in Peru
Violence against gay men
Violence against LGBT people